Jean-Claude Merlin (born 1954) is a French astronomer, founder-president of the Burgundy Astronomical Society and a discoverer of minor planets. He was laureate of the Marcel Bleustein-Blanchet Fondation de la Vocation in 1982 and received the Prix Georges Bidault de l'Isle of the Société astronomique de France in 1999.

The main-belt asteroid 57658 Nilrem, discovered by Michel Ory at the Jura Observatory in 2001, is named after him. Its naming citation was published on 6 March 2004.

List of discovered minor planets

References 
 

  (Images of Comet Tempel 1)

External links 
 Homepage of the Creusot Station, (IAU code 504)

1954 births
Discoverers of asteroids

20th-century French astronomers
Living people
21st-century French astronomers